The Despraiado Sustainable Development Reserve is a sustainable development reserve in the state of São Paulo Brazil.

Location

The Despraiado Sustainable Development Reserve is divided between the municipalities of Iguape (95.36%), Miracatu (1.01%) and Pedro de Toledo (3.6%) in the state of São Paulo.
The reserve extends along the Espraiado River.
It is almost completely surrounded by the Juréia-Itatins Ecological Station.

History

The Juréia-Itatins Mosaic of conservation units  was created by law 12.406 of 12 December 2006.
It included the Juréia-Itatins Ecological Station and the newly created Itinguçu and Prelado state parks, Despraiado and Barra do Una sustainable development reserves and the Ilhas do Abrigo e Guararitama Wildlife Refuge.
The state parks and sustainable development reserves were carved out of the ecological station.
On 11 September 2007 the procurer general of the state declared that law 12.406 was unconstitutional.
On 10 June 2009 a judgement upheld the finding of unconstitutionality.

Law 14.982 of 8 April 2013 again altered the limits of the Juréia-Itatins Ecological Station, re-categorising some areas.
These included the  Despraiado Sustainable Development Reserve.
The law recreated the Jureia-Itatins Mosaic, this time covering .

Notes

Sources

2006 establishments in Brazil
Protected areas of São Paulo (state)
Sustainable development reserves of Brazil